Alburnoides petrubanarescui, is a fish species of the family Cyprinidae, known from Iran. It can be differentiated from its cogenerates by differences in fin ray and vertebral counts, together with other morphological characters.

References

Further reading
GHASEMI, Hamid, et al. "Ichthyofauna of Urmia basin: Taxonomic diversity, distribution and conservation." Iranian Journal of Ichthyology 2.3 (2015): 177–193.
AZH, Z., I. SOURINEJAD, and Y. KEYVANI. "MORPHOMETRIC AND MERISTIC CHARACTERISTICS OF A NEW SPECIES OF ALBURNOIDES GENUS, ALBURNOIDES PETRUBANARESCUI, FROM ORUMIYEH LAKE BASIN, IRAN." (2012): 43–51.

Alburnoides
Fish described in 2009
Fish of Iran